Maulana Mohammad Mirza Yasoob Abbas is an Islamic cleric and speaker of All India Shia Personal Law Board  (AISPLB). He is a member of the India Islamic Culture Centre, Delhi and Shia College, Lucknow.

Views
Abbas criticized the Uttar Pradesh Government for ordering madrasas to participate in Independence Day celebrations without making the same requirement of all educational institutions.

Abbas welcomed the Supreme Court verdict banning triple talaq as a victory for the Muslim women, noting "there was no arrangement of triple talaq in the times of Holy Prophet...We want a strong legislation against triple talaq...A law similar to the one against the practice of Sati."

Speaking for the All India Shia Personal Law Board, Abbas criticized former Uttar Pradesh Shia Waqf Board chairman Waseem Rizvi for filing a petition to removal of 26 verses from the Quran which Rizvi claimed promoted terrorism. Abbas described the petition as an "insult to Muslims of the entire world."

References

External links
 

Year of birth missing (living people)
Living people
Indian Muslims
Shia Islam